Karl Freiherr von Plettenberg (18 December 1852, in Neuhaus – 10 February 1938, in Bückeburg) was a Prussian officer, and later General of Infantry during World War I. He was Commandant-General of  the Guards Corps, Adjutant General of the German Kaiser Wilhelm II and a recipient of Pour le Mérite.

Life and military career
Karl von Plettenberg was born on 18 December 1852 in Neuhaus into the Westphalian old noble Plettenberg family from the Sauerland.  He was the son of Baron Eugen von Plettenberg, an officer (Major and cavalry squadron commander) and his wife, Minette von der Borch (1827–1885).

World War I
Karl von Plettenberg was in command of the Guards Corps at the outset of World War I, assigned to the 2nd Army as part of the right wing of the forces that invaded France and Belgium as part of the Schlieffen Plan offensive in August 1914.  He led the Guards Corps at the First Battle of the Marne and the First Battle of Ypres.

He was decorated with the Pour le Mérite on 14 May 1915, and on 27 January 1916 awarded à la suite of the 1st Foot Guards Regiment. After criticism of the war by Erich Ludendorff and Paul von Hindenburg during the "battles of material" on the Western Front, Plettenberg was forced into retirement on 24 January 1917.

Later life
After his retirement, he returned to Bückeburg where he died on 10 February 1938.  Plettenbergstraße, a street in the town, is named after him.

Family
His oldest son, Karl-Wilhelm, was a lieutenant in the 1st Foot Guards Regiment of the Guards Corps at the outbreak of the war. He died on 30 August 1914 during the Battle of St Quentin.

His second son, Kurt von Plettenberg (1891–1945), was plenipotentiary of the House of Hohenzollern (the royal house of Prussia) and one of the inner circle of the July 20th plot against Hitler. He committed suicide on 10 March 1945 by jumping from a window during interrogation by the Gestapo.

Awards
 Order of the Crown 1st Class 
 Knight's Cross of the Royal House Order of Hohenzollern
 Iron Cross of 1870, 2nd class 
 Cross of the Prussian Service Award
 Honor Commander's Cross of the Princely House Order of Hohenzollern
 Grand Cross with Gold Crown in the Order of the Wendish Crown
 Commander of the Order of the Griffon (Mecklenburg)
 Honorary Grand Cross of the House and Merit Order of Peter Frederick Louis  (Oldenburg)
 Cross of Honour 1st Class with Crown (Reuss)
 Commander, First Class of the Albert Order
 Commander of the Order of the White Falcon
 Commander, First Class of the Ducal Saxe-Ernestine House Order
 Cross of Honor, First Class of the House Order of Lippe
 Military Merit Cross, 2nd Class (Waldeck)
 Merit Cross, 1st Class (Waldeck)
 Grand Cross of the Order of the Dannebrog (Denmark)
 Grand Cross of the Royal Victorian Order (United Kingdom)
 Grand Officer of the Order of the Crown of Italy
 Grand Cross of the Order of Orange-Nassau (Netherlands)
 Order of the Iron Crown, 2nd Class (Austria)
 Knight of the Order of Franz Joseph
 Grand Officer of the Order of the Lion and the Sun (Persia)
 Commander of the Order of the Star of Romania
 Officer of the Order of the Crown of Romania
 Imperial and Royal Order of the White Eagle (Russia)
 Order of St. Anna, 2nd Class with Diamonds (Russia)
 Officer of the Order of the White Eagle (Serbia)
 Grand Cross of the Order of the White Elephant (Thailand)
 Pour le Mérite (Prussia, 14 May 1915)
 Order of the Black Eagle (Prussia, 24 January 1917)
 Grand Cross of the Order of the Red Eagle, with Swords and Crown (Prussia, 24 January 1917)

Notes

References

 Karl-Friedrich Hildebrand, Christian Zweng: Die Ritter des Ordens Pour le Mérite des I. Weltkriegs, Band 3: P–Z, Biblio Verlag, Bissendorf 2011, S. 451-453
 Hanns Möller: Geschichte der Ritter des Ordens pour le mérite im Weltkrieg, Band II: M–Z, Verlag Bernard & Graefe, Berlin 1935, S. 442-444

1852 births
1938 deaths
Generals of Infantry (Prussia)
German Army generals of World War I
House of Plettenberg
Barons of Germany
People from the Province of Westphalia
Recipients of the Pour le Mérite (military class)
Recipients of the Iron Cross (1870), 2nd class
Grand Crosses of the Order of the Dannebrog
Knights Grand Cross of the Royal Victorian Order
Knights Grand Cross of the Order of Orange-Nassau
Knights of the Order of Franz Joseph
Commanders of the Order of the Star of Romania
Officers of the Order of the Crown (Romania)
Recipients of the Order of the White Eagle (Russia)
Recipients of the Order of St. Anna, 2nd class
Military personnel from Paderborn